The HTC One V is a smartphone designed and manufactured by HTC as part of the HTC One series which runs Android 4.0.3 with an HTC Sense 4.0 overlay. This phone is constructed from an aluminum unibody. Its design resembles the HTC Legend released in 2010. It features a 5-megapixel camera, 3.7-inch touchscreen (480×800 resolution), 512 MB RAM, a 1 GHz processor, and Beats audio. Officially announced by HTC on 26 February 2012, the HTC One V was released on 26 April 2012 in the UK.

In December 2012, HTC announced that the One V would not get an upgrade to Android 4.1. Still, in early 2013, independent ROM developers produced several ports of Android 4.1 and Android 4.2 Jelly Bean for the HTC One V, including Shpongle-Evervolv and Paranoid Android.

Camera 
The 5 megapixel camera has an aperture of f2.0, a 28 mm lens with a BSI sensor. The camera is capable of autofocus and includes a LED flash, as well as video recording in 720p. Images taken by the camera are processed by HTC's ImageChip, and includes ImageSense, a set of software tools that add functionality to the camera. This added functionality includes the ability to take HDR photos, improves performance in low-light situations, and allows the shooting of slow-motion video.

The One V does not feature a front-mounted camera.

Reception 
The HTC One V has received relatively positive reviews from various prominent technology sites.
Jamie Keene from The Verge praised the One V's design and durability, but was let down by the low-end specifications. Overall, the smartphone received a fairly positive score of 7.1 out of 10.
Mat Smith from Engadget shared similar opinions, but his main criticism was given to the phone's lower-end Qualcomm processor. Nevertheless, he lauded the rest of the device citing it as an inexpensive phone that could handle almost all day to day tasks.

Availability 

In Canada, the device is available on Bell Mobility, Telus Mobility, Virgin Mobile and Koodo Mobile.

In the United States, Virgin Mobile USA sells a CDMA variant of this device for $150 contract-free. U.S. Cellular also sells a CDMA version which is available for $129 upon signing a contract. 
On 5 September 2012, Cricket Wireless MVNO RadioShack No Contract Wireless service began selling the One V, Cricket itself also began selling it a couple of weeks later. Cricket's and RadioShack's One V are both compatible with the Muve Music service.

In Australia, the device is available on the Optus network.

In the United States, GSM versions with custom "Ninja Networks" logos and OS were given out for use as a ticket to the "Ninja Party" with the NinjaTel Van during DEF CON 20 in July 2012.

References

External links 
Official HTC page

One V
Android (operating system) devices
Mobile phones introduced in 2012
Discontinued smartphones